The Matra MS1 (abbreviation of Matra-Sports-1 ) was Matra's first open-wheel formula racing car, and was built in 1965. It was powered by a naturally aspirated, Cosworth MAE inline four-cylinder engine, producing , mated to a 5-speed Hewland T.L.200 manual transmission, that drove the rear wheels. The body is constructed out of lightweight fiberglass, and the chassis is an aluminum monocoque.

Design
The vehicle was designed as a conventional formula racing car. Since Matra wanted to quickly achieve success in international motorsport, as much as possible was copied from the British Formula 3 racing cars of the time. The vehicle had conventional wheel suspension and a Cosworth engine. This was an innovation insofar as the previous racing cars, which were still designed under the leadership of René Bonnet, had Renault engines in the rear.

The MS1 was a test car that was used to explore the technical possibilities in Formula 3. The tanks were moved to the side panels, supported by crossbars. This design ensured the excellent stability of the racing cars. The MS1 was the basis for the racing model, the MS5. During a thorough inspection, aerospace technicians from Matra found leaks in the tanks and had them sealed by mechanics. This method was used time and time again on the Matra and ensured that problems with leaking tanks were extremely rare.

References

Formula Three cars
Matra vehicles